@midnight with Chris Hardwick (shortened to and formerly exclusively titled @midnight) is an American late night Internet-themed panel game show, hosted by Chris Hardwick, that aired Monday through Thursday nights between October 21, 2013 and August 4, 2017 on Comedy Central. @midnight with Chris Hardwick premiered on October 21, 2013. It was syndicated internationally in Australia on SBS2 and The Comedy Channel, in the United Kingdom on Comedy Central Extra, and in Canada formerly on MuchMusic and later on The Comedy Network.

@midnight received a nomination for Outstanding Interactive Program at the 66th Primetime Emmy Awards. It received a nomination and win for Outstanding Social TV Experience at the 67th Primetime Emmy Awards.

On July 18, 2017, Comedy Central, Chris Hardwick, and Funny or Die mutually agreed to end @midnight with Chris Hardwick. The final episode, the 600th, aired on August 4, 2017.

In February 2023, Deadline Hollywood reported that sister broadcast network CBS would be reviving the series to replace The Late Late Show, after James Corden concludes his tenure on the program later in the year. The report indicated that Hardwick would not be involved in this reboot, and that Stephen Colbert (who hosts its lead-in The Late Show, and formerly hosted Comedy Central's The Colbert Report) would serve as executive producer.

Format
Three guests compete in a series of Internet-themed improv games. "Rapid Refresh" is a game where contestants craft a funny response or choose an answer based on an Internet meme or trending news headline.  On Thursdays during the run-up to the 2016 presidential primaries, this round was alternately referred to as "Panderdome" and focused on the candidates' gaffes and antics. Other games run daily include "Hashtag Wars" in which contestants buzz in with a phrase based on the given hashtag theme, and where fans can submit their own tweets which may show up in the game, and "Live Challenges" where the contestants write their answers over the commercial break. Hardwick would shout "Points!" and give the contestants arbitrary amounts.

Towards the end of the game, the third-place contestant is eliminated (with some rare exceptions), the scores are erased with a gesture, and the remaining two contestants play the final round called "FTW (For The Win)" Hardwick would read a question and the contestants would write down a response. The responses would then be read back anonymously and the winner would be decided by one whose response generates the most laughter/applause from the studio audience. The winner "wins the Internet for the next 23.5 hours".

Recurring games

 Audio Quiz: The panelists must identify the source of a sound from a list of possibilities. 
 Confession Bear: Chris gives the panel partial confessions from Reddit that use the Confession Bear meme, and the panelists must complete them.
 Cringe-Worthy: Based on the popular Reddit forum of the same name, the panelists come up with three-word phrases to make Chris cringe.
 Defriend Me: The panelists create Facebook statuses that would lead to Chris removing them as friends.
 eBay Price Is Right: The panelists attempt to guess the "buy it now" price of strange items for sale on eBay The Price Is Right style. 
 Etsy Pitchmen: The panelists write taglines to boost the appeal of bizarre Etsy products. 
 Free on Craigslist: A sixty-second game where the panelists list things they would give away for free.
 Goth Confessions: The panelists must guess which admissions goth kids made in their YouTube videos. 
 Iron Sheik: Real or Jabroni: Chris reads a topic that The Iron Sheik has tweeted about, and the contestants must decide if the wrestler loves or hates the subject. The tweet is read after the contestant is told they are right or wrong. 
 JuggalOK Cupid: The panelists must figure out which bizarre OkCupid dating profile description of a Juggalo is real.
 Linked Out: The panelists come up with ridiculous job titles that one might find on LinkedIn.
 Name That Vine: The panelists name the shown Vine video.
 Photobomb: The panelists decide if an edited out photobomb is creepy or cute.
 Rich Cat or Poor Cat: The panelists decide if it is a cash cat or a cat being humiliated by someone else on the internet.
 Sweet Emoji: The panelists translate emoji sentences.
 Texts from Last Night: The panelists respond to embarrassing drunk text messages.
 Thug Life or Hug Life: The panelists are shown the image of a child from a YouTube video and have to guess whether the video content would be thug or cute hug worthy.
 TumblReality: The panelists must figure out which bizarre Tumblr blog title is real.
 Tumblr? I Hardly Know Her: The panelists think up new Tumblr blogs that are just strange enough to be real.
 Yahoo Answers: Chris asks the panelists to come up with funnier responses than the ones on Yahoo! Answers.

Other gimmicks
The @midnight website provided a complete list of guests who have appeared on the show to date with a leaderboard that indicated who appeared the most and who had the most wins.

Production
The initial pilot for the show was called "Tweeter Dome" and was hosted by Thomas Lennon. It was revamped with Chris Hardwick as host, and trialed in the summer before airing at The Meltdown Comics store backroom. Lennon remained as co-executive producer throughout the run.

The show was shot on Stage 2 of the Hollywood Center Studios, where the CBS series I Love Lucy was originally shot.

Reception
During its initial 2013 run, the series averaged 453,000 viewers in the 18–49 ratings demographic, putting it above Bravo's Watch What Happens Live, E!'s Chelsea Lately, and TBS's The Pete Holmes Show. It also had the youngest audience of any late-night television show.

The week of February 17, 2014, was reported to be the show's highest rated to date; the show had 731,000 total viewers, and it tied The Daily Show as the most-watched late-night program on cable in the 18–34 demographic.

Awards

Episodes

See also
 Failosophy, an MTV game show with a panel of comedian competitors
 Dropout's Um, Actually

References

External links
 Official Website
 

2013 American television series debuts
2017 American television series endings
2010s American late-night television series
2010s American comedy game shows
Comedy Central late-night programming
Comedy Central original programming
Improvisational television series
Mass media about Internet culture
Nerdist Industries
Television shows filmed in Los Angeles
Television series by Funny or Die
Comedy Central game shows